Mount Alvernia High School is a private all-girls Roman Catholic high school in Newton, Massachusetts. The school is part of the Roman Catholic Archdiocese of Boston.

Background
Mount Alvernia High School was established in 1935 as an extension of Mount Alvernia Academy, an elementary school established in 1927 located in nearby Chestnut Hill. In 1972, the high school became a separate entity when it moved to 790 Centre St. in Newton, Massachusetts. The school's curriculum is college-preparatory and every student that attends graduates with at least one college acceptance.

The school has approximately 140 students, and its campus covers around 23 acres. The average class size is 12 students, with an overall teacher-to-student ratio of 1 to 9. There are numerous varsity sports teams, including cross country, soccer, swimming, volleyball, basketball, ice hockey, indoor track and field, golf, outdoor track and field, softball, and tennis.

Notes and references

External links
 School Website

Girls' schools in Massachusetts
Catholic secondary schools in Massachusetts
Schools in Middlesex County, Massachusetts
Educational institutions established in 1935
1935 establishments in Massachusetts